London Can Take It! is a short British propaganda film from 1940, which shows the effects of eighteen hours of the German blitz on London and its people. Intended to sway the US population in favour of Britain's plight, it was produced by the GPO Film Unit for the British Ministry of Information and distributed throughout the United States by Warner Bros. The film was directed by Humphrey Jennings and Harry Watt, and narrated by US war correspondent Quentin Reynolds.

Plot
The film opens with shots of the London streets in late afternoon, as people begin their commute home. The narrator reminds the audience that these people are part of the greatest civilian army the world has ever known, and are going to join their respective service before London's "nightly visitor" arrives. Listening posts are stationed as far away as the coastline and the "white fingers" of searchlights touch the sky.

Soon the Luftwaffe bombers arrive and begin their nightly work, bombing churches, places of business and homes, the work of five centuries destroyed in five seconds. But as soon as it is morning the British people go back to work the way they usually do, demonstrating the British 'stiff upper lip' attitude. Joseph Goebbels is quoted as saying that the bombings are having a great effect on British morale. He is right, the narrator says, the British people's morale is higher than ever.

Reception

Via an agreement with Warner Bros., the film was widely distributed in the United States of America by the British Ministry of Information with the intention of turning public opinion into favouring the USA declaring war on Germany. It did so particularly by depicting the war's effect on ordinary people, rather than on Britain as an outdated imperial power as she was often depicted by anti-war voices in America. A shorter domestic version was released as Britain Can Take It. The film was nominated for an Academy Award in 1941 for Best Live Action Short Film, One-Reel.

In popular culture
The film is edited and set to music by Public Service Broadcasting as one of the songs on their War Room EP.

See also 
List of Allied propaganda films of World War II

References

Sources 
War Stories - BBC Four documentary, 2008

External links 

National Archives page

Britmovie.co.uk page
British Film Institute page

1940 films
1940 short films
British World War II propaganda films
Films directed by Harry Watt
Films directed by Humphrey Jennings
Battle of Britain films
British black-and-white films
1940 documentary films
Black-and-white documentary films
Documentary films about London
GPO Film Unit films
British short documentary films
1940s short documentary films